Baksheesh or  (from  ) is tipping, charitable giving, and certain forms of political corruption and bribery in the Middle East and South Asia.

Etymology and usage
Baksheesh comes from the Persian word , which originated from the Middle Persian language. 

The word had also moved to other cultures and countries. In the Albanian, Arabic, Bosnian, Bulgarian, Indian, Macedonian, Romanian, Russian, Serbian, and Turkish languages, bakshish or бакшиш means "tip" in the conventional western sense. In Greek, μπαξίσι ) can mean a gift in general. In German and French, Bakschisch is a small bribe (in Romanian as well, depending on the context; usually employed as a euphemism to șpagă, which means outright bribe). In Maltese the word (buqxiex) refers to a very small payment.

Types 
Charity to beggars:  In Pakistan, beggars solicit alms by crying "baksheesh, baba!".
 Tipping: This does not correlate with the European system of tipping, as it also includes demonstrations of gratitude, respect, or veneration. An offering to the gods may be considered baksheesh. A faqir may also ask for baksheesh, but no thought is in his mind that he is begging. In fact, in Pakistan and the Muslim world, the giver of alms often salutes the beggar for having been given the opportunity to gain merit. In Egypt, baksheesh is often requested on top of fares to taxi drivers, and as service charges to waiters, doormen, shopkeepers, garage attendants, and many others employed in service-sector jobs.
 Outright bribery: In countries with endemic corruption, for instance, a member of the police force, or a migration or customs officer, or any other type of government official may be swayed from legitimately or illegitimately arresting, issuing a fine, or imposing a tax on someone by a suitable payment of baksheesh which would constitute a bribe, whether it was offered to the official or requested by the official.

In literature

When American mythologist Joseph Campbell travelled on his maiden visit to India in 1954, he encountered pervasive begging which he called the "Baksheesh Complex".

Mark Twain, after riding through the Biblical town of Magdala in 1867, makes note of his encounter with beggars and the term bucksheesh in his published work The Innocents Abroad: "They hung to the horses' tails, clung to their manes and the stirrups, closed in on every side in scorn of dangerous hoofs—and out of their infidel throats, with one accord, burst an agonizing and most infernal chorus: Howajji, bucksheesh! howajji, bucksheesh! howajji, bucksheesh! bucksheesh! bucksheesh! I never was in a storm like that before."

Leo Deuel, a writer on archaeology, sardonically described baksheesh as "lavish remuneration and bribes, rudely demanded but ever so graciously accepted by the natives in return for little or no services rendered".

Bram Stoker mentions backsheesh twice in Dracula. The log of the ship Demeter when recording the voyage from Varna to Whitby uses the word backsheesh separately during the description of two inspections by customs officers, once when the ship was entering the Bosphorus and again while on the way through the Dardanelles.

References

External links 
From Baksheesh to Bribery: Understanding the Global Fight Against Corruption and Graft edited by T. Markus Funk and Andrew S. Boutros, Oxford University Press, 

Charity
Corruption
Persian words and phrases

bg:Бакшиш